Lesbian, gay, bisexual, and transgender (LGBT) persons in Sudan  face legal challenges not experienced by non-LGBT residents. In July 2020, Sudan removed capital punishment for same-sex sexual activity, as well as corporal punishment. Sodomy remains illegal, and penalties of terms of imprisonment were retained. The maximum penalty, for a third offence, remains life imprisonment.

Law regarding anal sex 
Sodomy, defined as anal sex whether the couple is same-sex or opposite-sex, is illegal in Sudan. The Offence is defined in Article 148 of the Criminal Act of 1991. The original wording (translated) of the sodomy law, as amended in 2009, follows: There were no documented cases of executions for sodomy, prior to repeal of capital punishment for the offence. 
On 9 July 2020, Sudan abolished the death penalty as a punishment for anal sex. The Sudanese Sovereign Council also eliminated the imposition of 100 lashes and added two years to the sentence for a second offence. The penalty for a third offence was changed from death or life imprisonment to life imprisonment. A first offence is now punished with up to five years and a second offence with up to seven years. Sudanese LGBT+ activists hailed the reform as a 'great first step' but said it was not enough yet, and the end goal should be the decriminalisation of gay sexual activity altogether.

Historically

Nuba tribal society in the 1930s 
Siegfried Frederick Nadel wrote about the Nuba tribes in the late 1930s. He noted that among the Otoro, a special transvestitic role existed whereby men dressed and lived as women. Transvestitic homosexuality also existed amongst the Moru, Nyima, and Tira people, and reported marriages of Korongo londo and Mesakin tubele for the bride price of one goat.

In the Korongo and Mesakin tribes, Nadel reported a common reluctance among men to abandon the pleasure of all-male camp life for the fetters of permanent settlement. While not directly attributing the observed preference for camp life, Nadel highlighted two features of tribal life, as he viewed them, in connection with the preference: that it was a "matrilineal society... in which the fruits of procreation are not the man's", and "the strong emphasis on male companionship,... [and] also,... widespread homosexuality and transvesticism."

Politics regarding LGBT rights 
In the United Nations on 4 February 2011, International Lesbian, Gay, Bisexual, Trans and Intersex Association application for consultative status for the UN's Economic and Social Council was called for a vote. Sudan then called for a No Action Motion to prevent voting on the consultative status for the LGBT group, and their motion passed 9–7, so the issue was not voted on.

Sudan has voted against every supportive resolution of LGBT rights at the United Nations.

Social attitudes
Same-sex sexual relations policies have divided some religious communities. In 2006, Abraham Mayom Athiaan, a bishop in South Sudan, led a split from the Episcopal Church of Sudan for what he regarded as a failure by the church leadership to condemn homosexuality sufficiently strongly.

The U.S. Department of State's 2011 human rights report found that:

In the 2019 Arab Barometer Survey, 17% of Sudanese said homosexuality is acceptable.

Rights groups
The first LGBT association of the country is Freedom Sudan, founded in December 2006. However, no internet presence is seen from the group after 2013 on its Facebook page. Another group, Rainbow Sudan, was founded on 9 February 2012. Its founder, known as Mohammed, described the work and aims of the group: "...[W]e have groups that work online and offline. We form a small network of people working in an organized way to advance as much as possible LGBTQ issues, to show who we are, to stop discrimination, to see our rights recognized. We provide sexual education, psychological and emotional support, protection." Internet presence for Rainbow Sudan discontinued after January 2015.

Summary table

See also

 Human rights in Sudan
 LGBT rights in Africa

References

External links
"Rainbow Sudan", the Sudanese LGBT Association

LGBT in Sudan
Sudan
Human rights in Sudan
Law of Sudan
Politics of Sudan
Sudan